The 2021–22 Honduran Liga Nacional season was the 56th Honduran Liga Nacional edition since its establishment in 1965.  The tournament started in September 2021 and is scheduled to end in mid 2022.  The season is divided into two halves (Apertura and Clausura), each crowning one champion.  Due to the impact of the COVID-19 pandemic on association football, a new and more compact format is to be used.  The first stage was shortened from 18 to 14 weeks.  The tournament is divided into two groups of five.  The top teams of each group advance directly to the semifinal round, and the teams finishing 2nd and 3rd from each group have to play a playoff round.  At the end of the season, the three teams with the best record qualify to the 2022 CONCACAF League.

2021–22 teams

A total of 10 teams will contest the tournament, the same that participated in the 2019–20 season since no relegation was implemented.

Apertura

Championship Playoffs
Qualified teams
 Real España
 Vida
 Olimpia
 Motagua
 UPNFM
 Marathón

Clausura

Championship Playoffs
Qualified teams
 Real España
 Olimpia
 Victoria
 Motagua
 Vida
 Marathón
Final teams
 Real España
 Motagua

List of Foreign Players
This is a list of foreign players in the 2021–22 season. The following players:

 Have played at least one game for the respective club.
 Have not been capped for the Honduras national football team on any level, independently from the birthplace

Honduras Progreso
  Andres Salazar
  Oidel Perez
  Richard Mercado
  Leslie Heraldez

Marathón
  Braian Molina
  Juan Vieyra
  Lucas Campana
  Santiago Córdoba

Motagua
  Jonathan Rougier
  Lucas Baldunciel
  Roberto Moreira

Olimpia
  Yustin Arboleda Buenaños

Platense
  Francisco Del Riego
  Federico Maya
  Álvaro Klusener

Real España
  Ramiro Rocca
  Carlos Bernárdez
  Heyreel Saravia
  Omar Rosas

Real Sociedad
  Nelson Johnston
  Jamal Charles
  Akeem Roach

UPNFM
 

Victoria
  Luis Orlando Hurtado
  Yaudel Lahera

Vida
  Patryck Ferreira
  Marcos Velásquez
  Rafael Agámez
  Victor Blasco

 (player released during the Apertura season)
 (player released between the Apertura and Clausura seasons)
 (player released during the Clausura season)
 (player naturalised for the Clausura season)

External links
 LNP Official

References

Liga Nacional de Fútbol Profesional de Honduras seasons
Liga Nacional
Honduras
Honduran Liga Nacional, 2020-21